Chester is a city in and the county seat of Randolph County, Illinois, United States, on a bluff above the Mississippi River. The population was 6,814 at the 2020 census.

History

Founding
Samuel Smith is said to be the town's founder because he built the first home in Chester, established a ferry system, and began the construction of a mill in 1829. The town was named after Chester, England, the city from where his wife Jane Smith was from. The first business in Chester was a general store that opened in 1830 along with a castor oil press established by R. B. Servant, who furnished farmers with seed and growing methods to later buy the beans they produced for oil extraction. This was a flourishing business until the petroleum industry made it obsolete.
The first wedding in the town of Chester was held on February 4, 1834. Content Walker, the bride and Amzi Andrews, the groom held their wedding in a 16 feet square log cabin.

Cole Milling Company
The H.C. Cole Milling Company was founded by Nathan Cole in 1839. It started out as a small sawmill with a corn-grinding attachment which encouraged the townspeople to plant grains, and in a short time the first Cole flour mill was built. The mill still exists in Chester but it is now operated by Ardent Mills. Nathan Cole also brought the first electric generator to Chester and used the surplus of power from the mill to operate street lights. This was a modern convenience that was not even available in Chicago at that point. The generator is now on display at the Ford Museum in Dearborn, Michigan.

International Shoe Company
In 1916, Messrs. Bronson, Albert Gilster, Frank Wolff and John Herschbach developed the site for the International Shoe Company in the center of town where the Gilster Mary Lee Corp. is today. In 1922, a second building was built, and the company had more than 1000 employees and was producing thousands of pairs of children's shoes. During World War Two, the factory operated primarily by women produced military/combat boots for the troops in service. In 1953, payroll reached over $2,000,000. The factory was closed by the company in the early 1960s after 45 years of operation.

Prim Hosiery Mill
In 1925, the Prim Hosiery Mill was a knitting mill that began operations under Joshua Richman with 50 employees. The mill grew to employ more than 275 people and produced over 300,000 pairs of stockings a month with annual payroll exceeding $700,000. The knitting mill continued operations through the 1960s. The building still stands as one of the Gilster Mary Lee Corp. factory buildings.

Chester Pool
Construction began for the Chester Pool in 1939 as part of a Works Progress Administration (WPA) public works program to create employment during the Great Depression. It was completed in 1941, although due to the delivery of the filtration system being delayed it did not officially open until May 30, 1942, under the management of William Weber. A total of 250 swimmers visited the swimming pool in the first week and were charged 15 cents for weekdays and 25 cents for weekends.

Due to leaks and other deterioration issues, as well as high repair costs, the pool has been closed since 2014.

Home of "Popeye"
The park is located next to the Chester Bridge. Several of Segar's characters were created from his experiences with people of Chester. Chester's big event is its annual Popeye Picnic and parade, held the weekend after Labor Day. Popeye fans travel from all over the United States and the world to partake in the weekend activities. Most of the events and entertainment are free and all are family friendly.

New statues honoring the other Thimble Theater characters are added each year. 
 
"The Popeye and Friends Character Trail" is spread throughout Chester and to date includes:

 Popeye (1977) 
 J. Wellington Wimpy (2006)
 "Olive Oyl, Swee' Pea, and Jeep" (2007) 
 "Bluto" (2008) 
 "Castor Oyl and Whiffle Hen" (2009) 
 "Sea Hag and Bernard" (2010) 
 "Cole Oyl" (2011) 
 "Alice The Goon and her goon-child" (2012) 
 Poopdeck Pappy (2013) 
 Professor Wotasnozzle (2014) 
 RoughHouse (2015) 
 Pipeye, Pupeye, Peepeye, and Poopeye, Popeye's four nephews (2016) 
 King Blozo (2017) 
 Nana Oyl (2018) 
 Popeye's Pups (Unveiling in September 2019) 
 Sherlock & Segar (Unveiling in December 2019) 
 Toar the Caveman (Unveiling in October 2020) 
 Ham Gravy (Upcoming in 2021) 
 Oscar (Upcoming in 2022)

Popeye's Picnic and Parade
Popeye's Picnic is an event held in Chester the Friday, Saturday and Sunday following Labor Day in the month of September. Popeye's Picnic consists of rides, food stands, music, and fireworks. The Popeye Parade is held on a Saturday morning. Before the parade there is a walk and run for anyone who wants to participate. Medals and trophies are awarded to the top runners and walkers in each age category. A Popeye T-shirt is included with each entry. Many people from different towns participate in this parade. The parade consists of local school bands, band fronts, such as dance teams and cheerleaders, floats from various businesses, fire departments, veterans representing the United States, politicians marching, clowns passing out stickers and candy, and finally horses trail the parade.
Many people and businesses help sponsor the picnic and donate money and time.

Parks and historic sites
The Chester area includes a number of state parks and historic sites. The Fort Kaskaskia State Historic Site has a beautiful overlook of the Mississippi River. Down the hill from the park is the Pierre Menard Home, an unusually fine example of French Creole-style architecture, which was built around 1815 and was the home of the first lieutenant governor of Illinois. Across the river from the fort is Kaskaskia Island, the only part of Illinois west of the current channel of the Mississippi River. The island was the site of the first state capital of Illinois.  A historic church founded by French explorer Pere Jacques Marquette still holds weekly mass on the island. The Liberty Bell of the West, older than the Liberty Bell in Philadelphia, is located near the church on the island and was a gift from King Louis XV of France.

Five miles northeast of Chester is the Randolph County State Recreation Area, which has a  lake for fishing as well as hiking and equestrian trails.  South of Chester is the Turkey Bluffs State Fish and Wildlife Area, which has many scenic overlooks and trails to spot its namesake turkeys.  Part of the Middle Mississippi River National Wildlife Refuge, a division of the Mark Twain National Wildlife Refuge Complex, is located along the Mississippi River at Chester. Chester's Evergreen Cemetery is the burial site of the first governor of Illinois, Shadrach Bond, and U.S. Senator Elias Kent Kane, Illinois' first Secretary of State and architect of the state constitution. A monument to Bond is also located within the cemetery.  Additionally, Cole Memorial Park is located within the city limits of Chester.

Historic buildings
Buena Vista Bank, 1200 Swanwick Street
Schroeder-McClure Funeral Home (1865) 1019 State Street
Welge Brothers (1902), 953 State Street
Welge Studio, 981 State Street

Bridges
Chester is connected to Perry County, Missouri via a river bridge known as the Chester Bridge. The Chester Bridge was first constructed on August 23, 1942, as a toll bridge. Sections of this bridge were destroyed by a storm in July 1944, but it was reopened in August 1946.  Tolls ceased to be collected on January 1, 1989.

Media
Chester now has Channel 10 through Cable TV. It broadcasts events, post announcements and upcoming community events, relays emergency notices and much more to the citizens of Chester. Students from the Chester Grade School contribute daily broadcasts from the school.

Chester's newspaper is the Randolph County Herald Tribune, and the local radio station is KSGM.

Claims to fame
On April 11, 1842, Charles Dickens, the author of A Christmas Carol and Great Expectations, visited Chester with his wife. Mark Twain, the author of The Adventures of Tom Sawyer, a pilot on the Mississippi River between 1857 and the Civil War, supposedly on many of his trips stayed at Chester's Cliff House, a fine river hostelry. Twain also mentioned the blue windows of Chester's Cohen Home, visible from the Mississippi, in his book Life on the Mississippi.

The Chester post office contains a federally commissioned mural, Loading the Packet, painted  by Fay E. Davis through the Section of Painting and Sculpture, later called the Section of Fine Arts, of the Treasury Department. A former postal employee favored the mural so strongly that he said if the building should catch fire, the mural should be saved rather than the mail.

Chester was the filming location of scenes from the 1967 movie In the Heat of the Night and was only mentioned in the 1993 movie The Fugitive.

Geography
Chester is located at  (37.913947, -89.823140).

Demographics

As of the census of 2000, there were 8,400 people, 2,018 households, and 1,283 families residing in the city. The racial makeup of the city was 94.87% White, 3.59% African American, 0.15% Native American, 0.21% Asian, 0.04% Pacific Islander, 0.21% from other races, and 0.93% from two or more races. Hispanic or Latino of any race were 0.75% of the population.

There were 2,018 households, out of which 28.7% had children under the age of 18 living with them, 48.9% were married couples living together, 10.3% had a female householder with no husband present, and 36.4% were non-families. 32.1% of all households were made up of individuals, and 17.0% had someone living alone who was 65 years of age or older. The average household size was 2.32 and the average family size was 2.92.

In the city, the population was spread out, with 22.4% under the age of 18, 8.1% from 18 to 24, 27.9% from 25 to 44, 21.9% from 45 to 64, and 19.7% who were 65 years of age or older. The median age was 40 years. For every 100 females, there were 105.4 males. For every 100 females age 18 and over, there were 102.1 males.

The median income for a household in the city was $39,079, and the median income for a family was $49,426. Males had a median income of $36,103 versus $22,239 for females. The per capita income for the city was $22,190. About 5.4% of families and 9.7% of the population were below the poverty line, including 11.8% of those under age 18 and 13.7% of those age 65 or over.

Government and infrastructure
The Illinois Department of Corrections Menard Correctional Center is located in Chester. Prior to the January 11, 2003 commutation of death row sentences, male death row inmates were housed in Menard, Tamms, and Pontiac correctional centers. After that date, only Pontiac continued to host the male death row.

Economy
Large employers include the private label food company Gilster-Mary Lee, Corp.,
the maximum security Menard Correctional Center, and the maximum security forensics mental health center, Chester Mental Health Center.

Education

Public
Chester Community Unit School District No. 139 consists of two schools, Chester High School and Chester Grade School.

Private
St. John's Lutheran School and St. Mary's Catholic School are Chester's parochial schools.

Religious affiliations
There are eleven churches located in Chester.  These churches consist of the New Life First Pentecostal Church, First Baptist Church, First Christian Church of Chester, Family Worship Center Assembly of God, First Presbyterian Church, First Apostolic Pentecostal Church, First United Methodist Church, Grace Church Ministries, Peace Lutheran Church ELCA, St. John Lutheran Church LCMS, and St. Mary's Help of Christians Roman Catholic Church.

Notable people 

 Shadrach Bond, first Governor of Illinois
 William Hartzell, U.S. Representative
 Elias Kane, U.S. Senator and architect of the Constitution of Illinois
 Nora Lane, actress
 Pierre Menard, first Lieutenant Governor of Illinois
 E.C. Segar, creator of Popeye
 Tom Wham, game designer

Notes and references

External links

City of Chester official website
Popeye & Friends Character Trail official website
Randolph County Herald Tribune
Sun Times News Online
618 Football - Chester Yellow Jackets

County seats in Illinois
Cities in Randolph County, Illinois
Illinois populated places on the Mississippi River
Populated places established in 1829
1829 establishments in Illinois
Cities in Illinois